The  is a 42.7 km Japanese railway line operated by the third-sector railway operator Tosa Kuroshio Railway. It connects Gomen Station in the city of Nankoku with Nahari Station in the city of Nahari in Kōchi Prefecture.

Service outline
Limited-stop "Rapid" services and some all-stations "Local" services inter-run over the JR Shikoku Dosan Line to and from Kochi Station. Trains are formed of single or two-car diesel multiple units.

Stations

Rolling stock
A fleet of 11 9640 series ("9640" can be read as "Kuroshio" in Japanese) stainless steel-bodied diesel multiple unit cars are used on the line, including two cars, 9640-1S and 9640-2S with rounded front ends in a whale motif and an open observation balcony on one side.

History
The Tosa Kuroshio Tetsudo was established on 8 May 1986 for the purpose of resuming construction of the Sukumo and Asa lines, which had been planned by Japanese National Railways but abandoned. The company acquired a license to operate the Asa Line in January 1988, and commenced construction of the line, which opened on 1 July 2002.

See also
 List of railway lines in Japan

References

Rail transport in Kōchi Prefecture
1067 mm gauge railways in Japan
Railway lines opened in 2002
2002 establishments in Japan
Japanese third-sector railway lines